The 1993 Nobel Prize in Literature was awarded to the African-American novelist Toni Morrison (1931–2019) "who in novels characterized by visionary force and poetic import, gives life to an essential aspect of American reality." Morrison was awarded before the third novel of the Beloved Trilogy was published. She became the first black woman of any nationality and the second American woman to win the prize since Pearl S. Buck in 1938. She is also the 8th woman to receive the prize.

Laureate

Toni Morrison's works revolve around African-Americans; both their history and their situation in our own time. Her works often depict difficult circumstances and the dark side of humanity, but still convey integrity and redemption. The way she reveals the stories of individual lives conveys insight into, understanding of, and empathy for her characters. Morrison's unique narrative technique has developed with each new work. Among her well-known novels include The Bluest Eye (1970), Song of Solomon (1977), Beloved (1987), A Mercy (2008), and Home (2012).

Nominations
Among the strongest candidates according to the Swedish press were Hugo Claus, a Belgian poet, playwright and filmmaker who writes in Flemish; Seamus Heaney, an Irish poet who has been a front-runner for some time (awarded eventually on 1995); Bei Dao, a Chinese poet in exile; Ali Ahmed Saeed, a Lebanese poet who was born in Syria and goes by the pen name Adonis; Joyce Carol Oates and Thomas Pynchon, American writers whose names have surfaced from time to time.

Nobel lecture
Morrison delivered a Nobel lecture on December 7, 1993 about a fable about the power of language to elucidate and cloud, to oppress and liberate, to honor and sully, and to both quantify and be incapable of capturing a human experience.

In her acceptance speech, Morrison described the importance of language in our lives, saying: "We die. That may be the meaning of life. But we do language. That may be the measure of our lives."

References

External links
1993 Press release nobelprize.org
Award ceremony speech nobelprize.org

1993